Al-Masjid an-Nabawī, known in English as the "Prophet's Mosque", is the second mosque built by the Islamic prophet Muhammad in Medina, after that of Quba, as well as the second largest mosque and holiest site in Islam, after Masjid al-Haram in Mecca, in the Saudi region of the Hejaz. The mosque is located at the heart of Medina, and is a major site of pilgrimage that falls under the purview of the Custodian of the Two Holy Mosques. 

Muhammad himself was involved in the construction of the mosque. At the time, the mosque's land belonged to two young orphans, Sahl and Suhayl, and when they learned that Muhammad wished to acquire their land to erect a mosque, they went to Muhammad and offered the land to him as a gift; Muhammad insisted on paying a price for the land because they were orphaned children. The price agreed upon was paid by Abu Ayyub al-Ansari, who thus became the endower or donor of the mosque, on behalf or in favor of Muhammad. al-Ansari also accommodated Muhammad upon his arrival at Medina in 622 C.E.

Originally an open-air building, the mosque served as a community center, a court of law, and a religious school. It contained a raised platform or pulpit (minbar) for the people who taught the Quran and for Muhammad to give the Friday sermon (khutbah). Subsequent Islamic rulers greatly expanded and decorated the mosque, naming its walls, doors and minarets after themselves and their forefathers. After an expansion during the reign of the Umayyad caliph Al-Walid I, it now incorporates the final resting place of Muhammad and the first two Rashidun caliphs Abu Bakr and Umar ibn Al-Khattab. One of the most notable features of the site is the Green Dome in the south-east corner of the mosque, originally Aisha's house, where the tomb of Muhammad is located. Many pilgrims who perform the Hajj also go to Medina to visit the Green Dome.

In 1909, under the reign of Ottoman Sultan Abdul Hamid II, it became the first place in the Arabian Peninsula to be provided with electrical lights. From the 14th century, the mosque was guarded by eunuchs, the last remaining guardians were photographed at the request of then-Prince Faisal bin Salman Al Saud, and in 2015, only five were left. It is generally open regardless of date or time, and has only been closed to visitors once in modern times, as Ramadan approached during the COVID-19 pandemic in 2020.

History

Under Muhammad and the Rashidun (622–660 AD) 

The mosque was built by Muhammad in 622 AD after his arrival in Medina. Riding a camel called Qaswa, he arrived at the place where this mosque was built, which was being used as a burial ground. Refusing to accept the land as a gift from the two orphans, Sahl and Suhayl, who owned the land, he bought the land which was paid for by Abu Ayyub al-Ansari, and it took seven months to complete the construction of the mosque. It measured . The roof which was supported by palm trunks was made of beaten clay and palm leaves. The three doors of the mosque were the Bāb ar-Raḥmah ("Gate of the Mercy") to the south, Bāb Jibrīl ("Gate of Gabriel") to the west, and Bāb an-Nisāʾ ("Gate of the Women") to the east. At this time point in the history of the mosque, the wall of the qiblah was facing north to Jerusalem, and the Suffah was along the northern wall. The mosque remained unaltered during the reign of Abu Bakr.

Umar demolished all the houses around the mosque, except those of Muhammad's wives, to expand it. The new mosque's dimensions became . Sun-dried mud bricks were used to construct the walls of the enclosure. Umar constructed three more gates for entrance. He also added Al-Buṭayḥah for people to recite poetry.

The third Rashidun caliph Uthman demolished the mosque in 649. Ten months were spent in building the new rectangular shaped mosque whose face was turned towards the Kaaba in Mecca. The new mosque measured . The number of gates as well as their names remained the same. The enclosure was made of stones laid in mortar. The palm trunk columns were replaced by stone columns which were joined by iron clamps. Teakwood was used in reconstructing the ceiling filza.

Under subsequent Islamic states (660–1517 CE or 40–923 AH) 

In 706 or 707, the Umayyad caliph Al-Walid I instructed his governor of Medina, the future caliph Umar ibn Abd al-Aziz, to significantly enlarge the mosque. According to the architectural historian Robert Hillenbrand, the building of a large scale mosque in Medina, the original center of the caliphate, was an "acknowledgement" by Al-Walid of "his own roots and those of Islam itself" and possibly an attempt to appease Medinan resentment at the loss of the city's political importance to Syria under the Umayyads. 

It took three years for the work to be completed. Raw materials were procured from the Byzantine Empire. Al-Walid lavished large sums for the mosque's reconstruction and supplied mosaics and Greek and Coptic craftsmen. Its redevelopment entailed the demolition of the living quarters of Muhammad's wives and the expansion of the structure to incorporate the graves of Muhammad, Abu Bakr and Umar. The vocal opposition to the demolition of Muhammad's home from local religious circles was dismissed by Al-Walid. A wall was built to segregate the mosque and the houses of the wives of Muhammad. The mosque was reconstructed in a trapezoid shape with the length of the longer side being . For the first time, porticoes were built in the mosque connecting the northern part of the structure to the sanctuary. Minarets were also built for the first time as Al-Walid constructed four minarets around it.

His name was also inscribed on the walls of the mosque. He also planned to remove six steps to the minbar, but abandoned this idea, fearing damage to the wooden platforms on which they were built. According to an inscription of Ibn Qutaybah, the caliph Al-Ma'mun did "unspecified work" on the mosque. Al-Mutawakkil lined the enclosure of Muhammad's tomb with marble. In 1269, the Mamluk Sultan Baibars sent dozens of artisans led by the eunuch Emir Jamal al-Din Muhsin al-Salihi to rebuild the sanctuary, including enclosures around the tombs of Muhammad and of Fatima. The Mamluk Sultan Al-Ashraf Qansuh al-Ghuri built a dome of stone over his grave in 1476.

Ottoman period (1517–1805 & 1840–1919 CE, or 923–1220 & 1256–1337 AH) 

Sultan Suleiman the Magnificent (r. 1520-1566) rebuilt the east and west walls of the mosque, and added the northeastern minaret known as Süleymaniyye. He added a new altar called Ahnaf next to Muhammad's altar, Shafi'iyya, and placed a new steel-covered dome on the tomb of Muhammad. Sultan Suleiman the Magnificent wrote the names of the Ottoman sultans from Osman Ghazi to himself (Kanuni) and revived the "Gate of Mercy" (Bab ur-Rahme) or the west gate. The pulpit that is used today was built under Sultan Murad III (r. 1574-1595).

In 1817, Sultan Mahmud II (r. 1808-1839) completed the construction of "the Purified Residence" (Ar-Rawdah Al-Muṭahharah in Arabic, and Ravza-i Mutahhara in Turkish) on the southeast side of the mosque, and covered with a new dome. The dome was painted green in 1837, and has been known as the "Green Dome" (Kubbe-i Khadra) ever since. Sultan Mahmud II's successor, Sultan Abdulmecid I, took thirteen years to rebuild the mosque, beginning in 1849. Red stone bricks were used as the main material in reconstruction of the mosque.

The entire mosque was reorganized except for the tomb of Muhammad, the three altars, the pulpit and the Suleymaniye minaret. On the walls, verses from the Quran were inscribed in Islamic calligraphy. On the northern side of the mosque, a madrasah was built for teaching the Qur'an. An ablution site was added to the north side. The prayer place on the south side was doubled in width, and covered with small domes. The interiors of the domes were decorated with verses from the Qur'an and couplets from the poem Kaside-i Bürde. The qibli wall was covered with polished tiles with lines inscribed from the Qur'an. The places of prayer and courtyard were paved with marble and red stone. The fifth minaret, Mecidiyye, was built to the west of the surrounded area. Following the "Desert Tiger" Fakhri Pasha's arrest by his own officers having resisted for 72 days after the end of the Siege of Medina on 10 January 1919, 550 years of Ottoman rule in the region came to an end.

Saudi insurgency (1805–1811 CE or 1220–1226 AH) 
When Saud bin Abdul-Aziz took Medina in 1805, his followers, the Wahhabis, demolished nearly every tomb and dome in Medina in order to prevent their veneration, except the Green Dome. As per the sahih hadiths, they considered the veneration of tombs and places, which were thought to possess supernatural powers, as an offence against tawhid, and an act of shirk. Muhammad's tomb was stripped of its gold and jewel ornaments, but the dome was preserved either because of an unsuccessful attempt to demolish its complex and hardened structure, or because some time ago, Muhammad ibn Abd al-Wahhab, founder of the Wahhabi movement, wrote that he did not wish to see the dome destroyed.

Saudi rule and modern history (1925–present CE or 1344–present AH) 

The Saudi takeover was characterized by events similar to those that took place in 1805, when the Prince Mohammed ibn Abdulaziz retook the city on 5 December 1925. After the foundation of the Kingdom of Saudi Arabia in 1932, the mosque underwent several major modifications. In 1951, King Abdulaziz (1932–1953) ordered demolitions around the mosque to make way for new wings to the east and west of the prayer hall, which consisted of concrete columns with pointed arches. Older columns were reinforced with concrete and braced with copper rings at the top. The Suleymaniyya and Mecidiyye minarets were replaced with two minarets in Mamluk revival style. Two additional minarets were erected to the northeast and northwest of the mosque. A library was built along the western wall to house historic Qurans and other religious texts.

In 1974, King Faisal added  to the mosque. The area of the mosque was also expanded during the reign of King Fahd in 1985. Bulldozers were used to demolish buildings around the mosque. Escalators and 27 courtyards were among the additions to the mosque. A $6 billion project to increase the area of the mosque was announced in September 2012. After completion, the mosque should accommodate between 1.6 million to 2 million worshippers. In March of the following year, the Saudi Gazette reported that demolition work had been mostly complete, including the demolition of ten hotels on the eastern side, in addition to houses and other utilities.

Architecture 

The modern-day mosque is situated on a rectangular plot and is two stories tall. The Ottoman prayer hall, which is the oldest part of the mosque, lies towards the south. It has a flat paved roof topped with 27 sliding domes on square bases. Holes pierced into the base of each dome illuminate the interior when the domes are closed. The sliding roof is closed during the afternoon prayer (Dhuhr) to protect the visitors. When the domes slide out on metal tracks to shade areas of the roof, they create light wells for the prayer hall. At these times, the courtyard of the Ottoman mosque is also shaded with umbrellas affixed to freestanding columns. The roof is accessed by stairs and escalators. The paved area around the mosque is also used for prayer, equipped with umbrella tents. The sliding domes and retractable umbrella-like canopies were designed by the German Muslim architect Mahmoud Bodo Rasch, his firm SL Rasch GmbH, and Buro Happold.

The Green Dome 

The chamber adjacent to the Rawdah holds the tombs of Muhammad and two of his his companions and father-in-laws, Abu Bakr and Umar. A fourth grave is reserved for ʿĪsā (Jesus), as Muslims believe that he will return and will be buried at the site. The site is covered by the Green Dome. It was constructed in 1817 CE during the reign of the Ottoman sultan Mahmud II and painted green in 1837 CE.

The Rawdah 

Ar-Rawḍah ash-Sharīfah is an area between the minbar and the burial-chamber of Muhammad. It is regarded as one of the Riyāḍ al-Jannah. A green carpet was used to distinguish the area from the red carpet used in the rest of the mosque, though it is now also green. Considering visiting Madinah and performing the Ziyarah, Muhammad said: 
“Whoever visits me after my death is like he who had visited me during my life.”
<p>
"When a person stands at my grave reciting blessings on me, I hear it; and whoever calls for blessings on me in any other place, his every need in this world and in the hereafter is fulfilled and on the day of Qiyamah I shall be his witness and intercessor."

Mihrabs 

There are two mihrabs or niches indicating the qiblah in the mosque, one was built by Muhammad and another was built by Uthman. The one built by the latter was larger than that of Muhammad's, and it acts as the functional mihrab, whereas Muhammad's mihrab is a "commemorative" mihrab. Besides the mihrab, the mosque also has other niches which act as indicators for praying. This includes the Miḥrāb Fāṭimah or Miḥrāb at-Tahajjud, which was built by Muhammad for the late-night prayer.

Minbars 
The original minbar used by the Prophet Muhammad was a block of date palm wood. In 629 CE, a three staired ladder was added to it. Abu Bakr and Umar did not use the third step as a sign of respect to Muhammad, but Uthman placed a fabric dome over it, and the rest of the stairs were covered with ebony. The minbar was replaced by Baybars I, by Shaykh al-Mahmudi in 1417, and by Qaitbay in 1483. In 1590 it was replaced by the Ottoman sultan Murad III with a marble minbar, while Qaytbay's minbar was moved to the Quba Mosque. As of 2013, the Ottoman minbar is still used in the mosque.

Minarets 
In 1307, a minaret titled Bāb as-Salām ("Gate of the Peace") was added by Muhammad ibn Kalavun which was renovated by Mehmed IV. The minarets' upper, bottom and middle portion are cylindrical, octagonal and square shaped respectively.

Gallery

See also

References

Citations

Sources

Further reading 
 

 

 Prophet's Mosque: mosque, Medina, Saudi Arabia, in Encyclopædia Britannica Online, by The Editors of Encyclopaedia Britannica, Brian Duignan, Kanchan Gupta, John M. Cunningham and Amy Tikkanen

External links 

Watch Live Al-Masjid an-Nabawi
Detailed information on Masjid Al-Nabawi الْمَسْجِد النَّبَوي 
 The curious tale of the Abyssinian Guardians of Masjid Nabawi SAW
prophet muhammad's mosque 360º Virtual Tour

623 establishments
8th-century establishments in the Umayyad Caliphate
8th-century mosques
 
Islamic holy places
Mausoleums in Saudi Arabia
Mosques in Medina
Umayyad architecture
Abbasid architecture
Mamluk architecture
Buildings and structures of the Ottoman Empire
Ziyarat